Chalais is a commune in the Charente department in southwestern France. It is the southernmost town in the Charente with over 1,000 people. It lies along the river Tude.

Population

See also
Communes of the Charente department

References

Communes of Charente
County of Saintonge